The history of Professional wrestling in Canada dates back to the founding of Maple Leaf Wrestling, which opened in 1930 and was the first known professional wrestling company in the country. Many Canadian wrestlers including Bret Hart, Roddy Piper, Edge, Chris Jericho, and Kenny Omega have gone on to achieve worldwide success.

Notable Promotions

Border City Wrestling
Elite Canadian Championship Wrestling
Grand Prix Wrestling
High Impact Wrestling
International Wrestling Syndicate
Maple Leaf Wrestling
Northern Championship Wrestling
NCW Femmes Fatales
Smash Wrestling

Canadian wrestlers overseas

A-1
Abdullah the Butcher
Akam
Jason Anderson
John Anson
Fred Atkins †
Ben Bassarab
Chris Benoit †
Brute Bernard †
Sinn Bodhi
Rick Bognar †
Bob Boyer
Max Boyer
Dino Bravo †
Tyler Breeze
Eric Young
Ethan Page
Josh Alexander
Gino Brito
Farmer Brooks
Traci Brooks
Bulldog Bob Brown †
Kerry Brown †
Leo Burke
Samson Burke
Don Callis
George Cannon †
Christian (Cage)
Melissa Coates
Carly Colón (through his mother)
Steve Corino
Crazzy Steve
Dave McKigney
Scott D'Amore
Paul Diamond
Shawn Spears
John Quinn †
René Duprée
Edge
Ron Garvin
George Gordienko †
Archie Gouldie †
 Johnny Powers
 Sylvain Grenier
 Hart wrestling family
 Stu Hart †
 Smith Hart †
 Bruce Hart
 Keith Hart
 Dean Hart †
 Bret Hart
 Owen Hart †
 Natalya
 Teddy Hart
 Davey Boy Smith Jr.
 Chris Jericho
 Dwayne "The Rock" Johnson (through his father)
 Rocky Johnson †
 Billy Red Lyons †
 Tyson Kidd
 Gail Kim
 Ricky Hunter
 Gene Kiniski †
 Klondike Bill †
 Ivan Koloff †
 Killer Karl Krupp †
 Killer Kowalski †
 The Spoiler †
 Whipper Billy Watson †
 Jinder Mahal
 Michael Elgin
 Rick Martel
 Rosa Mendes
 The Missing Link †
 Geeto Mongol †
 Kenny Omega
 Kyle O'Reilly
  John Hill †
 Maryse Ouellet
 Pierre-Carl Ouellet
 Kevin Owens
 Pat Patterson †
 Roddy Piper †
 Lanny Poffo
 Bobby Roode
 Joe E. Legend
 Jacques Rougeau
 Raymond Rougeau
 Ruffy Silverstein
 Sandy Scott †
 Mike Sharpe †
 Tiger Ali Singh
 Tiger Joe Tomasso †
 Lance Storm
 Trish Stratus
 Robert Evans
 John Tenta †
 Johnny Devine
 Test †
 Luna Vachon †
 Maurice "Mad Dog" Vachon †
 Paul "Butcher" Vachon
 Taya Valkyrie
 Vampiro
 Val Venis
 Petey Williams
 Sami Zayn
 Tyson Dux
 Waldo Von Erich †
 Yvon Robert †
 Bobby Nelson †
 Skull Murphy †
 Hans Schmidt †
 Kurt Von Hess †

Note: † denotes wrestler is deceased

See also

 Canadian Death Tour
 Montreal Screwjob

References

 
History of professional wrestling